Geranylgeranyl pyrophosphate synthase is an enzyme that in humans is encoded by the GGPS1 gene.

Function 

This gene is a member of the prenyltransferase family and encodes a protein with geranylgeranyl diphosphate (GGPP) synthase activity. The enzyme catalyzes the synthesis of GGPP from farnesyl diphosphate and isopentenyl diphosphate. GGPP is an important molecule responsible for the C20-prenylation of proteins and for the regulation of a nuclear hormone receptor. Alternate transcriptional splice variants, encoding different isoforms, have been characterized.

Much like its homolog farnesyl diphosphate synthase, GGPS1 is inhibited by bisphosphonate compounds.

Clinical

Mutations in both copies of this gene have been associated with a syndrome of muscular dystrophy, hearing loss and ovarian insufficiency.

References

Further reading